Whirlwind is a 1951 American Western film directed by John English and written by Norman S. Hall. The film stars Gene Autry, Gail Davis, Thurston Hall, Harry Lauter, Dick Curtis and Harry Harvey Sr. The film was released on April 16, 1951, by Columbia Pictures.

Plot

Cast
Gene Autry as Gene Autry aka The Whirlwind
Smiley Burnette as Smiley Burnette
Gail Davis as Elaine Lassiter
Thurston Hall as Big Jim Lassiter
Harry Lauter as Wade Trimble
Dick Curtis as Lon Kramer
Harry Harvey Sr. as Sheriff Barlow
Gregg Barton as Bill Trask
Stan Jones as himself
Champion as Champ

References

External links
 

1951 films
American Western (genre) films
1951 Western (genre) films
Columbia Pictures films
Films directed by John English
American black-and-white films
1950s English-language films
1950s American films